Stacey Orlando Augmon (born August 1, 1968) is an American basketball coach and former player. He serves as the player development coach of the Sacramento Kings.  He played professionally in the National Basketball Association (NBA). He gained the nickname "Plastic Man" due to his athletic ability to contort his body.  He was also an assistant coach at his alma mater UNLV under coach Dave Rice. He was previously the head coach of Jeonju KCC Egis of the Korean Basketball League.

College
Augmon played college basketball for four years at UNLV under Coach Jerry Tarkanian.  During his junior year, the Runnin' Rebels won the 1990 NCAA Championship defeating the Duke Blue Devils. Augmon was the first three-time winner of the NABC Defensive Player of the Year, winning the award in 1989, 1990, and 1991. He is a class of 2002 member of the UNLV Athletic Hall of Fame along with teammates Greg Anthony and Larry Johnson.  In March 2011, HBO premiered a documentary entitled Runnin' Rebels of UNLV.

College Statistics

|-
| align="left" | 1987–88
| align="left" | UNLV
| 34 || - || 26.0 || .574 || 1.000 || .647 || 6.1 || 1.9 || 2.0 || 0.7 || 9.1
|-
| align="left" | 1988–89
| align="left" | UNLV
| 37 || 36 || 29.5 || .519 || .418 || .663 || 7.4 || 2.7 || 1.6 || 0.7 || 15.3
|-
| align="left" | 1989–90
| align="left" | UNLV
| 39 || - || 31.9 || .553 || .320 || .670 || 6.9 || 3.7 || 1.8 || 1.3 || 14.2
|-
| align="left" | 1990–91
| align="left" | UNLV
| 35 || - || 30.3 || .587 || .469 || .727 || 7.3 || 3.6 || 2.2 || 0.8 || 16.5
|- class="sortbottom"
| style="text-align:center;" colspan="2"| Career
| 145 || 36 || 29.5 || .555 || .420 || .677 || 6.9 || 3.0 || 1.9 || 0.9 || 13.9
|}

NBA career
Augmon was drafted by the Atlanta Hawks with the ninth pick of the 1991 NBA draft. He was the first player in the top ten draft picks to work out a deal, a 5-year contract worth between 6.5 and 7 million dollars. On January 3, 1995, Augmon scored a career-high 36 points during a 103–98 Hawks loss to the Trail Blazers. In total, Augmon played for the Hawks, the Detroit Pistons, the Portland Trail Blazers, the Charlotte Hornets, the New Orleans Hornets, and the Orlando Magic. He holds a scoring average of 8.0 points per game throughout his career.

The Magic decided not to re-sign Augmon for the 2006–07 NBA season, making him an unrestricted free agent. On October 3, 2007, the Denver Nuggets announced the signing of the 15-year veteran, but he was later waived on the 24th. One month and three days later, Denver re-hired Augmon, this time as a player development coach.

Post-playing career
Augmon is from L.A. County and is the president of a bike club. In May 2011, he left the Denver Nuggets to join the staff of former Rebels teammate Dave Rice as an assistant coach for UNLV.  In Sept 2016, he was named an assistant coach for the Milwaukee Bucks.

Augmon served as the head coach for Jeonju KCC Egis of the Korean Basketball League during the 2018–19 season leading the team to the KBL Semi-Finals and a 32–30 record.

NBA career statistics

Regular season 

|-
| align="left" | 1991–92
| align="left" | Atlanta
| 82 || 82 || 30.5 || .489 || .167 || .666 || 5.1 || 2.5 || 1.5 || .3 || 13.3
|-
| align="left" | 1992–93
| align="left" | Atlanta
| 73 || 66 || 28.9 || .501 || .000 || .739 || 3.9 || 2.3 || 1.2 || .2 || 14.0
|-
| align="left" | 1993–94
| align="left" | Atlanta
| 82 || 82 || 31.8 || .510 || .143 || .764 || 4.8 || 2.3 || 1.8 || .6 || 14.8
|-
| align="left" | 1994–95
| align="left" | Atlanta
| 76 || 76 || 31.1 || .453 || .269 || .728 || 4.8 || 2.6 || 1.3 || .6 || 13.9
|-
| align="left" | 1995–96
| align="left" | Atlanta
| 77 || 49 || 29.8 || .491 || .250 || .792 || 3.9 || 1.8 || 1.4 || .4 || 12.7
|-
| align="left" | 1996–97
| align="left" | Detroit
| 20 || 3 || 14.6 || .403 || .000 || .683 || 2.5 || .8 || .5 || .5 || 4.5
|-
| align="left" | 1996–97
| align="left" | Portland
| 40 || 7 || 16.3 || .517 || .000 || .732 || 2.2 || 1.0 || .8 || .2 || 4.7
|-
| align="left" | 1997–98
| align="left" | Portland
| 71 || 23 || 20.4 || .414 || .143 || .603 || 3.3 || 1.2 || .8 || .4 || 5.7
|-
| align="left" | 1998–99
| align="left" | Portland
| 48 || 21 || 18.2 || .448 || .000 || .684 || 2.6 || 1.2 || 1.2 || .4 || 4.3
|-
| align="left" | 1999–00
| align="left" | Portland
| 59 || 0 || 11.7 || .474 || .000 || .673 || 2.0 || .9 || .5 || .2 || 3.4
|-
| align="left" | 2000–01
| align="left" | Portland
| 66 || 23 || 17.9 || .477 || .000 || .655 || 2.4 || 1.5 || .7 || .3 || 4.7
|-
| align="left" | 2001–02
| align="left" | Charlotte
| 77 || 3 || 17.1 || .427 || .000 || .762 || 2.9 || 1.3 || .7 || .2 || 4.6
|-
| align="left" | 2002–03
| align="left" | New Orleans
| 70 || 3 || 12.3 || .411 || .000 || .750 || 1.7 || 1.0 || .4 || .1 || 3.0
|-
| align="left" | 2003–04
| align="left" | New Orleans
| 69 || 24 || 20.5 || .412 || .143 || .791 || 2.5 || 1.2 || .8 || .2 || 5.8
|-
| align="left" | 2004–05
| align="left" | Orlando
| 55 || 7 || 12.1 || .407 || .000 || .740 || 1.8 || .7 || .4 || .2 || 3.5
|-
| align="left" | 2005–06
| align="left" | Orlando
| 36 || 3 || 10.7 || .342 || .000 || .700 || 1.5 || .6 || .3 || .2 || 2.0
|- class="sortbottom"
| style="text-align:center;" colspan="2"| Career
| 1001 || 472 || 21.6 || .469 || .152 || .728 || 3.2 || 1.6 || 1.0 || .3 || 8.0

Playoffs 

|-
| align="left" | 1993
| align="left" | Atlanta
| 3 || 3 || 31.0 || .452 || .000 || .667 || 2.7 || 1.7 || 1.3 || .0 || 12.0
|-
| align="left" | 1994
| align="left" | Atlanta
| 11 || 11 || 29.5 || .517 || .000 || .711 || 2.6 || 2.5 || .6 || .2 || 10.8
|-
| align="left" | 1995
| align="left" | Atlanta
| 3 || 1 || 17.3 || .429 || .000 || .750 || 2.3 || 1.7 || 1.0 || .0 || 7.0
|-
| align="left" | 1996
| align="left" | Atlanta
| 10 || 10 || 31.4 || .486 || .000 || .825 || 3.6 || 2.7 || 1.1 || .6 || 10.3
|-
| align="left" | 1998
| align="left" | Portland
| 4 || 0 || 7.0 || .500 || .000 || .500 || .8 || .3 || .5 || .2 || 1.3
|-
| align="left" | 1999
| align="left" | Portland
| 13 || 0 || 13.5 || .357 || .000 || .833 || 2.5 || .4 || .6 || .2 || 2.7
|-
| align="left" | 2000
| align="left" | Portland
| 7 || 0 || 4.9 || .333 || .000 || .500 || .3 || .0 || .0 || .0 || 1.3
|-
| align="left" | 2001
| align="left" | Portland
| 2 || 0 || 14.0 || .400 || .000 || 1.000 || 2.0 || 2.0 || .5 || .0 || 5.0
|-
| align="left" | 2002
| align="left" | Charlotte
| 9 || 0 || 16.9 || .390 || .000 || .762 || 3.0 || 1.4 || 1.1 || .1 || 5.3
|-
| align="left" | 2003
| align="left" | New Orleans
| 4 || 0 || 17.3 || .333 || .000 || .875 || 2.5 || .8 || .8 || .0 || 4.3
|-
| align="left" | 2004
| align="left" | New Orleans
| 7 || 0 || 24.0 || .375 || .000 || .889 || 2.7 || 1.0 || .9 || .1 || 7.4
|- class="sortbottom"
| style="text-align:center;" colspan="2"| Career
| 77 || 25 || 19.1 || .438 || .000 || .780 || 2.3 || 1.3 || .7 || .2 || 6.0

See also
 List of NCAA Division I men's basketball players with 2,000 points and 1,000 rebounds

References

External links

Career Statistics
NBA.com Profile – Stacey Augmon

1968 births
Living people
All-American college men's basketball players
American expatriate basketball people in South Korea
American men's basketball players
Atlanta Hawks draft picks
Atlanta Hawks players
Basketball coaches from California
Basketball players at the 1988 Summer Olympics
Basketball players from Pasadena, California
Charlotte Hornets players
Denver Nuggets assistant coaches
Detroit Pistons players
Jeonju KCC Egis coaches
Medalists at the 1988 Summer Olympics
New Orleans Hornets players
Olympic bronze medalists for the United States in basketball
Orlando Magic players
Portland Trail Blazers players
Shooting guards
Small forwards
Sportspeople from Pasadena, California
United States men's national basketball team players
Universiade gold medalists for the United States
Universiade medalists in basketball
UNLV Runnin' Rebels basketball coaches
UNLV Runnin' Rebels basketball players